The Pogues were an English  or Anglo-Irish Celtic punk band fronted by Shane MacGowan and others, founded in King's Cross, London in 1982, as "Pogue Mahone" – the anglicisation of the Irish Gaelic póg mo thóin, meaning "kiss my arse". The band reached international prominence in the 1980s and early 1990s, recording several hit albums and singles. MacGowan left the band in 1991 owing to drinking problems, but the band continued – first with Joe Strummer and then with Spider Stacy on vocals – before breaking up in 1996. The Pogues re-formed in late 2001, and played regularly across the UK and Ireland and on the US East Coast, until dissolving again in 2014. The group did not record any new material during this second incarnation.

Their politically tinged music was informed by MacGowan and Stacy's punk backgrounds, yet used traditional Irish instruments such as the tin whistle, banjo, cittern, mandolin and accordion.

Band history

Pre-Pogues years: 1977–1982 
The future members of the Pogues first met when MacGowan (vocals), Peter "Spider" Stacy (tin whistle), and Jem Finer (banjo) were together in an occasional band called The Millwall Chainsaws in the late 1970s after MacGowan and Stacy met in the toilets at a Ramones gig at The Roundhouse in London in 1977. MacGowan was already with The Nips, though when they broke up in 1980 he concentrated more on Stacy's Millwall Chainsaws, who changed their name to The New Republicans.

Early years: 1982–1986 
 

In 1982, James Fearnley (accordion), who had been a guitarist with The Nips, joined MacGowan, Stacy, and Finer, forming the band, then known as Pogue Mahone. The new group played their first gig at The Pindar of Wakefield on 4 October 1982. 

By their show on Friday 29 October 1982 at 100 Club in London, Cait O'Riordan (bass) and Andrew Ranken (drums) had already joined the band. The Pogues appeared on Thursday 3 November 1983 at Gossips in Dean Street Soho with Trash Trash Trash and The Stingrays. 

The band played London pubs and clubs, and released a single, "Dark Streets of London", on their own, self-named label, gaining a small reputation – especially for their live performances, and national airplay on BBC Radio 1. They came to the attention of the media and Stiff Records when they opened for The Clash on their 1984 tour. Shortening their name to The Pogues (partly due to BBC censorship following complaints from Gaelic speakers in Scotland) they released their first album, Red Roses for Me, on Stiff Records that October.

The band gained more attention when the UK Channel 4's influential music show The Tube made a video of their version of "Waxie's Dargle" for the show. The performance, featuring Spider Stacy repeatedly smashing himself over the head with a beer tray, became a favourite with the viewers, but Stiff Records refused to release it as a single, feeling it was too late for it to help Red Roses for Me. Nevertheless, it remained a favourite request for the show for many years.

With the aid of producer Elvis Costello, they recorded the follow-up, Rum Sodomy & the Lash, in 1985 during which time guitarist Philip Chevron joined. The album title is a famous comment falsely attributed to Winston Churchill who was supposedly describing the "true" traditions of the British Royal Navy. The album cover featured The Raft of the Medusa, with the faces of the characters in Théodore Géricault's painting replaced with those of the band members. The album shows the band moving away from covers to original material. Shane MacGowan came into his own as a songwriter with this disc, offering up poetic storytelling, such as "The Sick Bed of Cúchulainn" and "The Old Main Drag", as well as definitive interpretations of Ewan MacColl's "Dirty Old Town" and Eric Bogle's "And the Band Played Waltzing Matilda" (this had previously been covered by Shane's fellow punk contemporaries Skids in 1981).

The band failed to take advantage of the momentum created by the strong artistic and commercial success of their second album. They first refused to record another album (offering up the four-track EP Poguetry in Motion instead); O'Riordan married Costello and left the band, to be replaced by bassist Darryl Hunt, formerly of Plummet Airlines and Pride of the Cross; and they added a multi-instrumentalist in Terry Woods, formerly of Steeleye Span. Looming over the band at this period (as throughout their entire career) was the increasingly erratic behaviour of their vocalist and principal songwriter, Shane MacGowan. Their record label, Stiff Records, went bankrupt soon after the 1987 release of the single "The Irish Rover" (with The Dubliners). Members of the band, including O'Riordan, acted in Alex Cox's Straight to Hell, and five songs by the band were included on the film's soundtrack album.

Mainstream success and break-up: 1987–1996 
The band remained stable enough to record If I Should Fall from Grace with God with its Christmas hit duet with Kirsty MacColl "Fairytale of New York". "Fairytale of New York" was released as a single in 1987 and reached No. 1 in the Irish charts and No. 2 in the British charts over Christmas (the time of peak sales). The song has become a festive classic in the UK and Ireland over the years, and was voted the best Christmas song of all time three years running in 2004, 2005, and 2006 in polls by music channel VH1 UK, despite not achieving Christmas Number One when it was released. It was also voted as the 27th greatest song never to reach UK#1 in another VH1 poll, and also voted as the 84th greatest song of all time by BBC Radio 2 listeners in the "Sold on Song" top 100 poll. In 2007 the record was briefly censored by the BBC because of the word "faggot" being deemed potentially offensive to homosexual people. Following protests from listeners, including the mother of Kirsty MacColl, the censorship was lifted.

The band was at the peak of its commercial success, with both albums making the top 5 in the UK (numbers 3 and 5 respectively), but MacGowan was increasingly unreliable. He failed to turn up for the opening dates of their 1988 tour of America, and prevented the band from promoting their 1990 album Hell's Ditch, so in 1991 the band sacked him. Vocal duties were for a time handled by Joe Strummer. Spider Stacy took over permanently after Strummer left in the winter of 1991. After Strummer's departure, the remaining seven Pogues recorded in 1993 Waiting for Herb, which contained the band's third and final top twenty single, "Tuesday Morning", which became their best-selling single internationally. Terry Woods and James Fearnley then left the band and were replaced by David Coulter and James McNally respectively. Within months of their departures, ill health forced Phil Chevron to leave the band; he was replaced by his former guitar technician, Jamie Clarke. This line-up recorded the band's seventh and final studio album, Pogue Mahone. The album was a commercial failure, and, following Jem Finer's decision to leave the band in 1996, the remaining members decided it was time to call it quits. According to Shane MacGowan, among the reasons of the break-up was disagreement concerning the political orientation of his songs, the band not wanting to sing too obvious pro-Republican songs – though some of their previous songs were already politically engaged: for instance, Streams of Whiskey is about the poet and IRA member Brendan Behan. Soon after the break-up Shane MacGowan recorded a song titled Paddy Public Enemy Number One as a tribute to the Republican leader Dominic McGlinchey, a former leader of the INLA killed a few years before.

Post-breakup 
After the Pogues's break-up, the three remaining long-term members (Spider Stacy, Andrew Ranken and Darryl Hunt) played together briefly as The Vendettas. They played mainly new Stacy-penned tracks, though Darryl Hunt also contributed songs, and the band's live set included a few Pogues songs. First Ranken then Hunt left the band, the latter going on to become singer/songwriter in an indie band called Bish, whose self-titled debut album was released in 2001. Ranken has gone on to play with a number of other bands, including Kippers, The Municipal Waterboard and, most recently, The Mysterious Wheels. In addition to The Vendettas, who Stacy freely admits lost all attraction when the Pogues reformed, Spider continued to write and record music with various bands, including the James Walbourne, Filthy Thieving Bastards, Dropkick Murphys and Astral Social Club.

Shane MacGowan founded Shane MacGowan and The Popes in 1992. They released two studio albums and broke up in 2002. His autobiography A Drink With Shane MacGowan, co-written with his journalist girlfriend Victoria Mary Clarke, was released in 2001. Jem Finer went into experimental music, playing a big part in a project known as "Longplayer", a piece of music designed to play continuously for 1,000 years without repeating itself. In 2005, Finer released the album Bum Steer with DB Bob (as DM Bob and Country Jem). James Fearnley moved to the United States shortly before leaving the Pogues. He was a member of The Low And Sweet Orchestra and later the Cranky George Trio. Philip Chevron reformed his former band The Radiators, which briefly included former Pogue Cait O'Riordan. Terry Woods formed The Bucks with Ron Kavana, releasing the album Dancin' To The Ceili Band in 1994. Later, he formed The Woods Band, releasing the album Music From The Four Corners of Hell in 2002.

Reunion: 2001–2014 

The band, including MacGowan, re-formed for a Christmas tour in 2001 and performed nine shows in the UK and Ireland in December 2004. In 2002 Q magazine named the Pogues one of the "50 Bands To See Before You Die". In July 2005, the band – again including MacGowan – played at the annual Guilfest festival in Guildford before flying out to Japan where they played three dates. Japan is the last place they all played together before MacGowan was originally sacked in 1991, and they have a strong following there. They played a date in Spain in early September. The reunited Pogues played dates in the UK with support from the Dropkick Murphys in late 2005, and re-released their 1987 Christmas classic "Fairytale of New York" on 19 December, which went straight in at No. 3 in the UK Singles charts on Christmas Day 2005, showing the song's enduring popularity. On 22 December 2005 the BBC broadcast a live performance (recorded the previous week) on the Jonathan Ross Christmas show with Katie Melua filling in for the late Kirsty MacColl, the first time the band had played the song live on television. The following week they performed live on the popular music show CD:UK.

Shane MacGowan wrote a blog for The Guardian in 2006, detailing his thoughts on the current tour.

The band was awarded the lifetime achievement award at the annual Meteor Ireland Music Awards in February 2006. In March 2006, the band played their first US dates with Shane in over 15 years. The band played a series of sold-out concerts in Washington, D.C., Atlantic City, Boston, and New York. Later they played a series of highly acclaimed and sold-out gigs during mid-October 2006 in San Francisco, Las Vegas, and Los Angeles, and toured Glasgow, Manchester, Birmingham, London, Dublin, and Nottingham in mid-December 2006. They began a second US tour in March 2007, once again to coincide (and conclude) with a Roseland Ballroom New York City show on Saint Patrick's Day. 2007 has proved to be the most prolific year of touring since the reunion. A tour of the west coast of America and eleven dates in the UK in December complement the headlining festival appearances made in the summer across Europe (Sweden, Belgium and Spain). They continue to be in huge demand, often selling out very large venues, despite criticism of selling out, and claims that arenas and festivals do not suit the band's sound.

Guitarist Phil Chevron has stated there were no plans to record new music or release a new album. Chevron said that one way to keep enjoying what they were doing was to avoid making a new album, although he did say that there still is a possibility in the future for new music, but certainly not in the near future. Terry Woods has commented that MacGowan has been writing, and most of it sounds good. In 2008 the band released a box set Just Look Them Straight in the Eye and Say....POGUE MAHONE!!, which included rare studio outtakes and previously unreleased material.

The band received mixed reviews of their performances though they continued to pull the crowds. Reviewing a March 2008 concert, The Washington Post described MacGowan as "puffy and paunchy," but said the singer "still has a banshee wail to beat Howard Dean's, and the singer's abrasive growl is all a band this marvelous needs to give its amphetamine-spiked take on Irish folk a focal point". The reviewer continued: "The set started off shaky, MacGowan singing of 'goin' where streams of whiskey are flowin,' and looking like he'd arrived there already. He grew more lucid and powerful as the evening gathered steam, through two hours and 26 songs, mostly from the Pogues' first three (and best) albums". In December 2010 the Pogues (with support from Crowns) played what was billed as a farewell UK Christmas tour.

In March 2011, the Pogues played a six-city/ten-show sold out US tour titled "A Parting Glass with The Pogues" visiting Chicago, Detroit, Baltimore, Washington, D.C., Boston, and New York City (in that order), with only the last three cities getting more than one show. Stacy said "I think we are basically pretty certain this is the last tour of this type we'll be doing in the States. There might be the odd sort of one-off here and there. We're not saying this is absolutely, definitely the end".

In August 2012, the Pogues embarked on a 30th Anniversary Summer 2012 8-city European Tour scheduled from 4 August 2012 at the Stockton Weekender Festival in Stockton-on-Tees, UK to 11 & 12 September 2012 at L'Olympia, Paris, two shows filmed and recorded for a live album and DVD released on 19 November 2012.

In March 2013, the Pogues released 30:30: The Essential Collection, a 2-disc set featuring 30 songs along with eleven videos. In October 2013, the Pogues released a box set titled Pogues 30 containing remastered versions of all of their studio albums plus a previously unreleased live album featuring Joe Strummer at the London Forum in December 1991.

Guitarist Philip Chevron died on 8 October 2013 in Dublin, Ireland from oesophageal cancer, aged 56.

In December 2013, the Pogues went on a four-date UK Christmas tour, followed by a few shows during spring and summer 2014. The Pogues' last performance on British soil occurred on 5 July 2014 at the British Summer Time festival in London's Hyde Park. The Pogues' last ever performance (to date) occurred on 9 August 2014 during the "Fête du bruit dans Landerneau" festival in Landerneau, Brittany, France.

About his future with the Pogues, in a 24 December 2015 interview with Vice Magazine, when the interviewer asked whether the band were still active, Shane MacGowan said: "We're not, no", saying that, since their 2001 reunion happened, "I went back with [The] Pogues and we grew to hate each other all over again", adding, "I don't hate the band at all – they're friends. I like them a lot. We were friends for years before we joined the band. We just got a bit sick of each other. We're friends as long as we don't tour together. I've done a hell of a lot of touring. I've had enough of it".

Long-time Pogues bassist Darryl Hunt died in London on 8 August 2022, at the age of 72.

Members 
 Spider Stacy – vocals, tin whistle (1982–1996, 2001–2014)
 Jem Finer – banjo, mandola, saxophone, hurdy-gurdy, guitar, vocals (1982–1996, 2001–2014)
 James Fearnley – accordion, mandolin, piano, guitar (1982–1993, 2001–2014)
 Shane MacGowan – vocals, guitar, banjo, bodhrán (1982–1991, 2001–2014)
 Andrew Ranken – drums, percussion, harmonica, vocals (1982–1996, 2001–2014)
 Darryl Hunt – bass (1986–1996, 2001–2014; died 2022)
 Terry Woods – mandolin, cittern, concertina, guitar, vocals (1986–1993, 2001–2014)
 Cait O'Riordan – bass, vocals (1982–1986, 2004)
 Philip Chevron – guitar, vocals, mandolin, banjo (1985–1994, 2001–2013; his death)
 Joe Strummer – vocals, guitar (1991–1992; also replaced an ailing Phil Chevron for a US tour in 1987; died 2002)
 Dave Coulter – mandolin, violin, ukulele, percussion (1993–1996)
 James McNally – accordion, whistles, percussion (1993–1996)
 Jamie Clarke – guitar, vocals (1994–1996)

Timeline

Discography 

 Red Roses for Me (1984)
 Rum Sodomy & the Lash (1985)
 If I Should Fall from Grace with God (1988)
 Peace and Love (1989)
 Hell's Ditch (1990)
 Waiting for Herb (1993)
 Pogue Mahone (1996)

Notes

References

External links
  – official site
 
 
  – official site
 The Pogues article in The Guardian

 
Celtic punk groups
Folk punk groups
Musical groups disestablished in 1996
Musical groups established in 1982
Musical groups from London
Musical groups reestablished in 2001
1982 establishments in England
2014 disestablishments in England
Stiff Records artists
Island Records artists